Gnosticism used a number of religious texts that are preserved, in part or whole, in ancient manuscripts, or lost but mentioned critically in Patristic writings.

Gnostic texts

Gnostic texts preserved before 1945
Prior to the discovery at Nag Hammadi, only the following texts were available to students of Gnosticism. Reconstructions were attempted from the records of the heresiologists, but these were necessarily coloured by the motivation behind the source accounts.
 Works preserved by the Church:
 Acts of Thomas (Especially Hymn of the Pearl or The Hymn of the Robe of Glory)
 The Acts of John (Especially The Hymn of Jesus)
 The Bruce Codex (purchased in 1769 by James Bruce):
 Books of Jeu, also known as The Gnosis of the Invisible God
 The Untitled Text
 The Askew Codex (British Museum, bought in 1784):
 Pistis Sophia: Books of the Savior
 The Berlin Codex or The Akhmim Codex (found in Akhmim, Egypt; bought in 1896 by Carl Reinhardt):
 Apocryphon of John
 an epitome of the Acts of Peter
 The Wisdom of Jesus Christ
 Unknown origin:
 The Secret Gospel of Mark
 The Hermetica

Complete list of codices found in Nag Hammadi

 Codex I (also known as The Jung Codex):
 The Prayer of the Apostle Paul
 The Apocryphon of James (also known as the Secret Book of James)
 The Gospel of Truth
 The Treatise on the Resurrection
 The Tripartite Tractate
 Codex II:
 The Apocryphon of John
 The Gospel of Thomas a sayings gospel
 The Gospel of Philip
 The Hypostasis of the Archons
 On the Origin of the World
 The Exegesis on the Soul
 The Book of Thomas the Contender
 Codex III:
 The Apocryphon of John
 The Gospel of the Egyptians
 Eugnostos the Blessed
 The Sophia of Jesus Christ
 The Dialogue of the Savior
 Codex IV:
 The Apocryphon of John
 The Gospel of the Egyptians
 Codex V:
 Eugnostos the Blessed
 The Apocalypse of Paul
 The First Apocalypse of James
 The Second Apocalypse of James
 The Apocalypse of Adam
 Codex VI:
 The Acts of Peter and the Twelve Apostles (includes The Hymn of the Pearl)
 The Thunder, Perfect Mind
 Authoritative Teaching
 The Concept of Our Great Power
 Republic by Plato – The original is not Gnostic, but the Nag Hammadi library version is heavily modified with then-current Gnostic concepts.
 The Discourse on the Eighth and Ninth – a Hermetic treatise
 The Prayer of Thanksgiving (with a hand-written note) – a Hermetic prayer
 Asclepius 21–29 – another Hermetic treatise
 Codex VII:
 The Paraphrase of Shem
 The Second Treatise of the Great Seth
 Gnostic Apocalypse of Peter
 The Teachings of Silvanus
 The Three Steles of Seth
 Codex VIII:
 Zostrianos
 The Letter of Peter to Philip
 Codex IX:
 Melchizedek
 The Thought of Norea
 The Testimony of truth
 Codex X:
 Marsanes
 Codex XI:
 The Interpretation of Knowledge
 A Valentinian Exposition, On the Anointing, On Baptism (A and B) and On the Eucharist (A and B)
 Allogenes
 Hypsiphrone
 Codex XII
 The Sentences of Sextus
 The Gospel of Truth
 Fragments
 Codex XIII:
 Trimorphic Protennoia
 On the Origin of the World
 Fragments

The so-called "Codex XIII" is not a codex, but rather the text of Trimorphic Protennoia, written on "eight leaves removed from a thirteenth book in late antiquity and tucked inside the front cover of the sixth." (Robinson, NHLE, p. 10) Only a few lines from the beginning of Origin of the World are discernible on the bottom of the eighth leaf.

Mandaean texts

 Ginza Rabba (The Great Treasure, also known as The Book of Adam) (DC 22)
 Qolastā (Canonical Prayerbook) (DC 53)
 Sidra d-Nišmata (Book of Souls) (first part of the Qolastā)
  (The Responses) (part of the Qolastā)
 Drašâ d-Jōhânā (Mandaean Book of John, also known as The Book of Kings)
 Diwan Abathur (Scroll of Abatur) (DC 8)
 Harran Gawaitha (Scroll of Great Revelation) (DC 9, 36)
 Diwan Maṣbuta d-Hibil Ziwa (The Baptism of Hibil Ziwa) (DC 35)
 Alf trisar šuialia (The 1012 Questions) (DC 36 [complete, with all 7 books], DC 6 [incomplete])
 Šarh d-qabin d-Šišlam Rabbā (The Wedding of the Great Šišlam) (DC 38)
 Šarh d-Traṣa d-Taga d-Šišlam Rabbā (The Coronation of the Great Šišlam – describes a ritual for the ordination of the Mandaean clergy)
 Asfar Malwāšē (The Book of the Zodiac) (DC 31)
 Diwan Malkuta ʿLaita (Scroll of Exalted Kingship) (DC 34)
 see more

Other
 The Hymn of Jesus
 Acts of Peter
 Coptic Apocalypse of Peter
 Dialogue of the Saviour
 Odes of Solomon
 Gospel of Judas
 Gospel of the Saviour

Quoted or alluded
These texts are mentioned or partially quoted in the writings of the Church Fathers.
 Gospel of Basilides mentioned by Origen, Jerome, Ambrose, Philip of Side, and Bede.
 Basilides' Exegetica mentioned in Hippolytus of Rome (Refutatio Omnium Haeresium VII, ixv and X, x) and Clement of Alexandria (Stromata IV, xii and IV, xxiv–xxvi)
 Epiphanes' On Righteousness, mentioned in Clement of Alexandria (Str. III, ii).
 Heracleon, Fragments from his Commentary on the Gospel of John, mentioned in Origen (Commentary on the Gospel of John)
 Naassene Fragment mentioned in Hippolytus (Ref. 5.7.2–9).
 Ophite Diagrams mentioned in Celsus and Origen
 Ptolemy's Commentary on the Gospel of John Prologue, mentioned in Irenaeus.
 Ptolemy's Letter to Flora, mentioned in Epiphanius.
 Theodotus: Excerpta Ex Theodoto mentioned in Clement of Alexandria.

Manuscripts
 Askew Codex contains Pistis Sophia and some other unknown texts.
 Berlin Codex, 5th century, contains a fragmentary Gospel of Mary, out of nineteen pages, pages 1–6 and 11–14 are missing entirely, the Apocryphon of John, The Sophia of Jesus Christ, and an epitome of the Act of Peter.
 Bruce Codex contains the first and second Books of Jeu and three fragments – an untitled text, an untitled hymn, and the text "On the Passage of the Soul Through the Archons of the Midst".
 Codex Tchacos, 4th century, contains the Gospel of Judas, the First Apocalypse of James, the Letter of Peter to Philip, and a fragment of Allogenes.
 Nag Hammadi library contains a large number of texts (for a complete list see the listing)
 Three Oxyrhynchus papyri contain portions of the Gospel of Thomas:
 Oxyrhyncus 1: this is half a leaf of papyrus which contains fragments of logion 26 through 33.
 Oxyrhyncus 654: this contains fragments of the beginning through logion 7, logion 24 and logion 36 on the flip side of a papyrus containing surveying data.
 Oxyrhyncus 655: this contains fragments of logion 36 through logion 39 and is actually 8 fragments named a through h, whereof f and h have since been lost.

See also

 General topics
 New Testament apocrypha
 Development of the New Testament canon
 Pseudepigrapha
 Gnosticism
 Textual criticism
 Agrapha

 Related literature
 List of Gospels
 Apocalyptic literature
 Epistles
 Acts of the Apostles (genre)
 List of New Testament papyri
 Hypostasis of the Archons

Notes

External links
 The Gnostic Society Library
 Gnostics, Gnostic Gospels, & Gnosticism – from earlychristianwritings.com

Lost apocrypha
Religion-related lists
Religious bibliographies